Rupa is a genus of beetles in the family Carabidae, containing the following species:

 Rupa japonica Jedlicka, 1935
 Rupa uncinata Kasahara, 1994
 Rupa uenoi Habu, 1976

References

Platyninae